Josh Matlow (born November 27, 1975) is a Canadian politician who has served on the Toronto City Council since 2010. He presently represents Ward 12 Toronto—St. Paul's. 

Matlow was a Toronto District School Board (TDSB) trustee between 2003 and 2010 before his election to council representing St. Paul's. He was elected to City Council following the 2010 municipal election, and was re-elected in 2014, 2018 and 2022.

Background
Matlow was a co-director of Earthroots, an Ontario environmental non-governmental organization. He also worked for the Canadian Peace Alliance, organizing against the war in Iraq. He lives in Toronto with his wife, Melissa and daughter, Molly. His father, Ted Matlow, was a federally appointed judge and his mother, Elaine Mitchell, was a retired high school teacher.

Matlow has written articles for several local newspapers including the Toronto Sun and Toronto Star. He hosted a call-in radio show on University of Toronto station CIUT, was a weekly contributor and co-host on Toronto talk-radio station AM 640 and CFRB. He hosted a talk radio show called The City with Josh Matlow on Toronto radio station Newstalk 1010 and was a weekly columnist for the Toronto Star.

Political career
In 2002 and at the age of 26, Matlow was asked by the Ontario Liberal Party to run as their candidate in Dufferin—Peel—Wellington—Grey in a by-election against Progressive Conservative Premier Ernie Eves. He lost by 3,560 votes.

Trustee (2003—2010) 
In 2003, Matlow was elected to the Toronto District School Board as a trustee and re-elected to the same position in 2006. He worked on a number of initiatives including installation of solar panels on school rooftops, keeping Toronto's school pools open, and helping students to achieve 'economic literacy'. He spoke against a proposal to create an Africentric school in Toronto.

Election to council and first term (2010—2014) 
In 2010, Matlow was elected to Toronto City Council where he has become known as a political centrist and has been working on issues such as creating a Toronto Seniors Strategy, a regional transit plan, removing the Ontario Municipal Board's (OMB) purview over Toronto planning decisions, and combating gridlock.

Second term (2014—2018) 
In 2014, he was re-elected to Toronto City Council with the highest vote count (24,347) and highest winning percentage (86.2%) of any councillor candidate across the city.

TTC subway extension into Scarborough 
Matlow supports the seven-stop Scarborough LRT over the three-stop subway. He refers to the LRT as the "evidence-based" transit option, as it serves more people within walking distance and won't require an additional $1 billion in debt and taxes from the City of Toronto.

In February 2015, Matlow submitted five administrative inquiries asking city staff to address unanswered questions. The Toronto Star wrote an editorial stating that "City Councillor Josh Matlow is right to press for answers on the ill-judged Scarborough Subway Extension with even basic numbers still unknown." The city manager's response confirmed that city staff still do not know how many people will ride the Scarborough subway, where it will go, or how much it will cost.

Third term (2018—2022) 
On March 9, 2020, Josh Matlow became the first known Canadian politician to go into quarantine after coming into close contact with a person who had tested positive for COVID-19.

In 2020, Matlow put forward a motion in Toronto City Council to defund the Toronto Police Service by 10 percent and allow city council to read the line by line police budget they vote on. "It's time to defund the police budget and re-balance our use of public funds".  The motion was defeated.

Fourth term (2022—present)

Election results

Municipal

Provincial

References

External links

Ontario Liberal Party candidates in Ontario provincial elections
Canadian environmentalists
Toronto District School Board trustees
1975 births
Living people
Toronto city councillors
Jewish Canadian politicians